Lars Einar Nordrum (October 28, 1921 – January 25, 1973) was a Norwegian theater and film actor. He is especially remembered for acting the voice of Jennings in a series of Norwegian radio plays in the 1950s and 1960s.

Biography
Nordrum debuted in 1935 at the Central Theater, and from 1938 onward was engaged with the National Theater, except for two seasons at the People's Theater. He also played roles in film and on radio. Nordrum was a gifted character artist that created unique stage characters with a strong personal pithiness. He was noted for his comic characters in works by Shakespeare and Holberg, his strong stage presence in The Merry Widow, and his performances in the musical Fantasticks at Chat Noir. As an artist, however, he had his greatest impact in tragic roles, such as the title role in Strindberg's Erik XIV, Oswald in Ghosts, and Earl Harald in Sigurd Slembe.

Nordrum had his film debut with a minor role in Tante Pose (1940), and he played notable roles in films including Vi gifter oss (1951), Vildanden (1963), and Liv (1967). Nordrum also made a strong impression as a pianist in Sverre Udnæs's Aske on NRK's Television Theater in 1973.

Nordrum was married to the Norwegian-born Swedish actress Lillebil Kjellén.

Filmography

1940: Tante Pose as Olaf, the dean's son
1945: The Journey Away as Ole
1948: Hvor fartøy flyte kan (documentary)
1949: Vi flyr på Rio as Frans Hauge
1951: Vi gifter oss as Einar
1954: I moralens navn as Rolf Hagen
1955: The Summer Wind Blows as Klaus Aare
1956: Kvinnens plass as Tore Haugen
1956: Ektemann alene as Per Sande
1957: Selv om de er små as Bernt Friis
1960: Veien tilbake as Øyvind Dahl, a violinist
1963: Onkel Vanja (TV)
1964: Vildanden as Gregers Werle
1964: Elskeren (TV)
1964: Klokker i måneskinn as the author "Bridgepartiet"
1964: Nydelige nelliker as the narrator
1965: De kalte ham Skarven as Pastor Bardal
1965: Klimaks as Krister's father
1966: Sult as Hertugen (not credited)
1967: Liv as the fashion designer
1968: Festival i Venedig as Prince Luigi Bourbon Corieli (TV)
1970: Døden i gatene
1973: Anton as Dr. Fuchs
1973: Aske as the pianist (TV)
1974: Sommerfuglene as Mr. Zimmler

References

External links
 

1921 births
1973 deaths
Norwegian male stage actors
Norwegian male film actors
Norwegian male television actors
Norwegian male radio actors
20th-century Norwegian male actors
Male actors from Oslo